Upper Lamptrai, or Lamptrai Kathyperthen or Lamptra Kathyperthen (Λάμπτρα καθύπερθεν), was a deme of ancient Attica. Lamptrai Kathyperthen and nearby Coastal Lamptrai (Lamptrai Paraloi) were between Anagyrus, Thorae, and Aegilia. At Lamptra the grave of Cranaus was shown.

The site of Upper Lamptrai was near modern Lambrika.

References

Populated places in ancient Attica
Former populated places in Greece
Demoi